Hypsopygia albilunalis is a species of snout moth in the genus Hypsopygia. It was described by Aristide Caradja in 1927. It is found in China.

References

Moths described in 1927
Pyralini
Taxa named by Aristide Caradja